Justin David Everett is an American politician who served in the Colorado House of Representatives from the 22nd district from 2013 to 2019, as a member of the Republican Party. During his tenure in the state house he was referred to as Dr. No for his opposition to large amounts of legislation with him being the legislator who voted against the most legislation.

Everett's family came from New York, and he was educated at the University of Colorado Denver and the University of Colorado Denver. He was elected to the state house in the 2012 election and served until he ran for Colorado State Treasurer in the 2018 election. He left the state house in 2018, in a failed primary campaign for state treasurer and later unsuccessfully ran for his seat in the state house in the 2020 election.

Early life

Justin David Everett's family was from New York, and they moved to Colorado in 1978. He graduated from the University of Colorado Denver with a master of business administration degree and graduated from the Sturm College of Law at the University of Denver with a juris doctor.

Career

Colorado House of Representatives

Elections

Everett ran for the Republican nomination for a seat in the Colorado House of Representatives in the 2012 election. He defeated Loren Bauman in the Republican primary and defeated Democratic nominee Mary Parker and Libertarian nominee Lynn L. Weitzel in the general election. He defeated Bauman in the 2014 primary and defeated Democratic nominee Parker and Libertarian nominee Weitzel in the general election. He defeated Parker in the 2016 election when she ran as an independent candidate. Colin Larson was elected to succeed Everett in 2018.

Everett ran for state house in the 2020 election and the virtual assembly voted by acclamation to place him at the top of the primary ballot, but he was defeated by Larson in the primary.

Tenure

Everett was referred to as Dr. No, first by Representative Max Tyler, and as Justin Neverett for him forcing the reading of all legislation and then voting no. He voted against forty-eight percent of legislation in 2015, which was more than any other member of the state house.

Statewide campaign

Everett announced on April 18, 2017, that he would run for the Republican nomination for Colorado State Treasurer to succeed Walker Stapleton, who was term-limited. During the campaign he was endorsed by United States Representative Ken Buck. He received forty-nine percent of delegate vote at the assembly while none of the other candidates received more than the thirty percent required to be placed onto the primary ballot. Brian Watson defeated Everett in the Republican primary and lost in the general election to Democratic nominee Dave Young.

Electoral history

References

External links
Official page at the Colorado General Assembly
Campaign site
Biography at Ballotpedia

1971 births
21st-century American politicians
Chapman University alumni
Living people
Republican Party members of the Colorado House of Representatives
People from Jefferson County, Colorado
Sturm College of Law alumni
University of Colorado Denver alumni